Cape Hunter is a rocky promontory on the west shore of Commonwealth Bay, Antarctica,  west of Cape Denison. It was discovered in 1912 and explored the following year by the Australasian Antarctic Expedition under Douglas Mawson, who named it for John G. Hunter, chief biologist of the expedition.

Important Bird Area
An 11 ha site at the cape has been designated an Important Bird Area (IBA) by BirdLife International because, in 1997/98 it supported a colony of some 16,000 breeding pairs of Adélie penguins. Breeding Antarctic petrels, snow petrels and south polar skuas were also present.

References

External links

 

Important Bird Areas of Antarctica
Penguin colonies
Hunter